Jordan Olympic Committee (IOC code: JOR) is the National Olympic Committee representing Jordan.

Member federations
 Jordan Athletics Federation
 Jordan Badminton Federation
 Jordan Basketball Federation
 Jordan Federation for Billiard and Snooker
 Jordan Bowling Federation
 Jordan Bridge Federation
 Jordan Cycling Federation
 Jordan Fencing Federation
 Jordan Sport Information Federation
 Jordan Amateur Boxing Association
 Jordan Kick Boxing Association
 Jordan Sport Medicine Federation
 Jordan Paralympic Committee
 Jordan School Sports Federation
 Jordan Squash Federation
 Jordan Swimming Federation
 Jordan Table Tennis Federation
 Jordan Taekwondo Federation
 Jordan Volleyball Federation
 Jordan Weightlifting Federation
 Royal Jordanian Equestrian Federation
 Jordan Judo Federation
 Jordan Football Association
 Jordan Shooting Federation
 Jordan Handball Federation
 Jordan Gymnastics Federation
 Brazilian Jiu-Jitsu Federation of Jordan
 Royal Jordanian Chess Federation
 Jordan Bodybuilding Federation
 Jordan Wrestling Federation
 Jordan Golf Federation
 Jordan Karate Federation
 Jordan Triathlon Association
 Jordan Marine Sports Federation
 Jordan Motorsport
 Jordan Rugby Committee
 Jordan Camel Committee
 Jordan Tennis Federation

	The Jordan Olympic Committee is the umbrella organisation responsible for managing, developing and promoting sport in Jordan.

See also
Jordan at the Olympics

References

External links
 Official website

Jordan
Oly
Jordan at the Olympics
1957 establishments in Jordan

Sports organizations established in 1957